Montrose Community School District is a public school district in the northwestern corner of Genesee County in the U.S. state of Michigan and in the Genesee Intermediate School District. The District serves all of the city of Montrose and most of Montrose Township.

According to the district's web site, in 2010 approximately 1400 students in 2016 were estimated to attend one of three schools in the district: Carter Elementary School for grades K-4 (600 students), Kuehn-Haven Middle School for grades 5-8 (400 students), Hill-McCloy High School for grades 9-12 (400 students).

Athletics
Montrose joined the Mid-Michigan Activities Conference in 2018. Previously, Montrose had been a charter member of the Genesee Area Conference (originally known as the Genesee 8 Conference) since 1978 after leaving the now defunct Mid-Eastern 8 Conference. Since the Genesee Area Conference's  inaugural season, Montrose has been successful in football and wrestling, winning numerous conference, district, regional and state championships in boys' and girls' athletic sports.

Football success and championships
Montrose has one of the top high school American football programs in Genesee County.

At the end of the 2013 season, The Rams had amassed a record of 423-187-6 since 1950, with a winning percentage of .693. Over this 62-year period, the Rams have won or shared 42 conference titles.

Beginning in 1979, the Rams won 29 Genesee Area Conference titles in football, including 17 consecutive championships from 1988 through 2004. It was during this era that the Rams won two MHSAA state football championships. The first of these two state titles came in 1998 when Montrose defeated the Wittemore-Proscott Cardinals 24-14 in the Class "C" title game held at the Pontiac Siverdome. Montrose again captured the Division "5" state football crown in 2002 by defeating Constantine 14-0 to cap and undefeated 14-0 campaign.

Including their two state titles, Montrose has appeared in the MHSAA state football playoffs 18 times between 1980 and 2010.

The book No Quitters Here: Quest for the Dome by B.M. Woodward discusses the Montrose High School football team's ten-year winning streak from 1988 to 1998.

Ram wrestling
Along with its success in football, Montrose also enjoys a tradition of wrestling championships. The Rams have won ten MHSAA team wrestling championships between 1975 and 2005.

The Rams have also won many GAC, district and regional championships.

Notable alumni
 Former Michigan Lt. Governor John D. Cherry (2002–2010), graduated from Hill-McCloy High School.
 Former major league pitcher Scott Aldred, graduated from Hill-McCloy High School in 1986. He was drafted by the Detroit Tigers and played for seven teams in his 10-year major league career.
 Dan Severn was an amateur wrestler at Hill McCloy High School. He held the national record for consecutive pins (112 over 4 years). He won a World Junior amateur wrestling title in 1977. He was a three-time All-American at Arizona State University, and an alternate on the 1984 Olympic team.
 NFL Wide Receiver Malik Taylor
 NFL Coach Aubrey Pleasant

References

External links
 montroseschools.org
 

School districts in Michigan
Education in Genesee County, Michigan